Meshkan Rural District, formerly Darreh Yam Rural District (Persian: دهستان دره يام), is a rural district (dehestan) in Meshkan District, Khoshab County, Razavi Khorasan Province, Iran. At the 2006 census, its population (including the portions of the rural district split off to form Yam Rural District) was 10,607, in 2,660 families; excluding those portions, the population was 4,702, in 1,113 families.  The rural district has 7 villages.

References 

Rural Districts of Razavi Khorasan Province
Khoshab County